Upogebia capensis, or Cape mud shrimp, is a mud shrimp of the family Upogebiidae.  It is endemic to the Atlantic and Indian Ocean coasts of southern Africa and occurs from Namibia (Luderitz) to Mozambique.

Upogebia capensis lives in a permanent burrow under stones on the open coast, but never in estuaries. It is similar to Upogebia africana, but the walking legs of capensis do not have spines at their bases.

References

Thalassinidea
Crustaceans of the Atlantic Ocean
Crustaceans of the Indian Ocean
Crustaceans of South Africa
Crustaceans described in 1843
Taxa named by Christian Ferdinand Friedrich Krauss